Enga Laima FC is a semi-professional association football club based in Wabag in the Enga Province of Papua New Guinea. The club was founded in 2019. 

The club's competitive debut was in the 2019 edition of the Papua New Guinea National Soccer League, where they finished 5th out of six teams in the Highlands Conference.

History 
In early January 2019, it was reported that a club called Laima FC, supported by Enga Governor Sir Peter Ipatas, had entered into the 2019 edition of the Papua New Guinea National Soccer League. By the start of the season, the name had been adjusted to Enga Laima FC.

In their opening match, the club lost 5–0 to Aporo Mai, before an 11–1 defeat at the hands of Kagua-Erave. The only points the side were able to collect in the opening half of the season was a 2–2 draw with Simbu Angra. The side forfeited their scheduled return fixture against Aporo Mai, but showed marked signs of improvement in their final three matches – they picked up their first win of the season against Blue Kumuls on 6 April, before a shock 1–0 victory over Kagua-Erave lifted them off the foot of the table. They finished the season with a 3–1 victory over Mount Hagen FC, denying their opponents qualification to the playoff stage.

Domestic Record

National Competitions 

 Papua New Guinea National Soccer League
 2019: Highlands Conference: 5th

References 

Football clubs in Papua New Guinea
2019 establishments in Papua New Guinea
Association football clubs established in 2019